Fu Tianyu (born 16 July 1978) is a Chinese short track speed skater. She competed in two events at the 2006 Winter Olympics.

References

External links
 
 
 

1978 births
Living people
Chinese female short track speed skaters
Olympic short track speed skaters of China
Short track speed skaters at the 2006 Winter Olympics
Sportspeople from Heilongjiang
Asian Games medalists in short track speed skating
Short track speed skaters at the 2003 Asian Winter Games
Short track speed skaters at the 2007 Asian Winter Games
Medalists at the 2003 Asian Winter Games
Medalists at the 2007 Asian Winter Games
Asian Games gold medalists for China
Asian Games silver medalists for China
21st-century Chinese women